Seniye Merve Dalbeler (born 27 June 1987) is a Turkish volleyball player. She is 183 cm and plays as outside hitter. Since 2011 she plays for Turkish club Fenerbahçe.

Career
Dalbeler played for Fenerbahçe in the 2012 FIVB Club World Championship held in Doha, Qatar and helped her team to win the bronze medal after defeating Puerto Rico's Lancheras de Cataño 3-0.

Awards

Clubs
 2011-12 CEV Champions League -  Champion, with Fenerbahçe Women's Volleyball
 2011 Turkish Super Cup -  Runner-up, with Fenerbahçe Universal
 2012 FIVB World Club Championship –  3rd place, with Fenerbahçe
 2012-13 CEV Cup -  Runner-up, with Fenerbahçe
 2013-14 CEV Cup -  Champion, with Fenerbahçe
 2013–14 Turkish Women's Volleyball League -  Runner-up, with Fenerbahçe
 2013-14 Turkish Cup -  Runner-up, with Fenerbahçe
 2014 Turkish Super Cup -  Runner-up, with Fenerbahçe Grundig
 2014-15 Turkish Cup -  Champion, with Fenerbahçe Grundig
 2014–15 Turkish Women's Volleyball League -  Champion, with Fenerbahçe Grundig
 2014–15 Turkish Super Cup -  Champion, with Fenerbahçe Grundig
 2016–17 Turkish Volleyball Cup  Champion, with Fenerbahçe Grundig
 2016–17 Turkish Volleyball League  Champion, with Fenerbahçe Grundig

See also
Turkish women in sports

References

1987 births
Living people
Turkish women's volleyball players
Fenerbahçe volleyballers
Galatasaray S.K. (women's volleyball) players
Eczacıbaşı volleyball players
Yeşilyurt volleyballers
Turkey women's international volleyball players
Volleyball players at the 2015 European Games
European Games gold medalists for Turkey
European Games medalists in volleyball
20th-century Turkish sportswomen
21st-century Turkish sportswomen